Transmetro is a bus rapid transit system in Guatemala City, Guatemala. The first line opened on February 3, 2007. The fleet consists of modern Volvo buses made by Ciferal in Brazil. The buses have fixed stops and partly run on dedicated lanes, avoiding other traffic. Both stops and vehicles are guarded by municipal police. Service began in 2007 with a route between the City Hall (Municipalidad) and a market place at Centra Sur (Southern Transfer Station). The second route, Eje Central, started operations on August 14, 2010. This route serves the central corridor between 6th and 7th Avenue of Zones 1, 4, and 9.

Buses run down the middle of the street, are separated from other traffic, and stop at stations approximately every kilometre. The stations are in the middle of the street, near areas of heavy pedestrian activity. Platforms are elevated so as to be level with the floor of the bus. Passengers may access the station via stairways, street crossings, or in some places tunnels. Elevator access for the disabled is not presently available. However, individuals requiring accessible entry can cross the street to access transportation through gates painted with a wheelchair logo. Roofs in the stations are covered with a transparent plastic covering.

The buses are articulated Brazilian-made vehicles manufactured by Volvo and can carry approximately 100 passengers, including standing passengers.

Security is provided by Guatemala City's transit police. Officers in fluorescent yellow vests are situated at most stations on the route. Sometimes security personnel ride on the Transmetro.

History 
The southern line was first completed with funding from the Municipal government of Guatemala city, however, the central line was funded by a private initiative. On February 3, 2007, when the buses started to operate on the southern line, regional buses or "Chicken Buses" were banned from entering the city from the south roads. The change effectively made travelling the CA1 much faster compared before the line began to work.

Chronological History

 January 1999: Mayor Fritz Garcia Gallont proposes implementing the Transmetro project, but it does not happen within his administration. 
 January 2004: Alvaro Arzu, after being elected as mayor for a second term, confirmed that he considered the Transmetro as a solution to alleviate congestion in the city.
 June 2004: The city council says the first phase would be completed by the end of the year.
 December 2004: City council announces that they would push the opening date to late 2005.
 June 2006: City council pledges to do its best effort to complete phase 1 by the end of the year.
 December 2006: The opening date is pushed to January 2007.
 January 2007: Due to delays in completing from infrastructure, the opening date is pushed by one month to February 2007.
 February 3, 2007: Phase one, renamed "Eje Sur" (South line), begins operating in the city. 
 August 14, 2010: The second phase opens, renamed "Eje central" also known as "Corredor Central" (Central line, or also known as Central corridor).
 December 2012: A short line begins to operate in the Historic Downtown aka "Centro Historico"
 April 2014: A new line begins to operate to serve Zone 18 from the Atlantida neighbourhood to the Downtown core.
 2014: Construction begins for the northern line, later renamed line 6 after the Zone in which it terminates from the downtown core. 
 April 2015: Line 6 (Eje Norte), begins service.
 January 2016: A new short line opens to serve the Racecourse neighbourhood to the downtown core
 2016: All lines were renamed after the zones they operate in or serve. Eje Sur was renamed Line 12 as it mainly operates in zone 12, Corredor Central was renamed Line 13 as it connects Zone 13 with the Downtown Core, Cnetro Historico was renamed Line 1 as it serves the Zone 1 Downtown, Eje Norte was renamed Line 6 as it terminates in Zone 6, Eje Nor-oriente is renamed Line 18 as it terminates in Zone 18, Hipodromo was renamed Line 2 as it serves Zone 2. 
2017: Line 21 begins operating as a pilot project to improve transportation to and from the USAC University campus. It had not yet been changed to a permanent route but is marked on the map as the pink line.
2019: Line 7 begins to operate with some stations still under construction. Line 21 is made permanent. 
2020: All Line 7 stations are open to the public. In early 2020, the new mayor announces plans to phase out cash-fares.
2021: New payment card "Tarjeta Ciudadana" becomes the default payment method, and cash payments are no longer accepted.
2023: Several service changes were made to the network, including the official removal of all direct interchanges, with the exception of those on Lines 6 & 18 and Lines 1 & 2, addition of new stations on Lines 1, 2, 12, 13, and 18, and the discontinuing of Line 21.

Fare payments 
When the Transmetro first opened, it accepted only coins, as the fare was set at Q1.00. After the national government began service of the Transurbano, a local bus service similar to the ones in North American cities, it also began to accept the SIGA smart card which had to be tapped to a reader. Passengers must pay the fare each time they enter the Transmetro, which means a two-way trip costs Q2.00, regardless of how far one goes. In November 2015, payments by the SIGA smart card were no longer accepted because of a multitude of problems and disagreements.

A shift to contactless payment options was announced in early 2020. However, implementation of new fare gates, including accessible ones, was only completed at some stations on line 12 and 13. The modernization project, also included support for the SIGA smart card, which had been accepted until 2015. Additionally, the new gates would also feature support for NFC payments, as well as debit and credit cards. The gates received public support due to the COVID-19 pandemic, which discouraged many from the use of cash payments to reduce the risk of transmission.

In early February 2021, payment by coins was no longer accepted, and payment by the new Tarjeta Ciudadana (Citizen Card) became the default payment method. The card can be acquired at stations along line 12, line 13, and convenience stores that have been allowed to sell it across the city. After purchasing the card at a cost of GTQ.20.00, users will receive 5 free rides and can register their name on to it using a system similar to cards such as the SUICA card in Japan. As an additional incentive for riders to purchase the card, the card offers 4 free rides daily for users with a disability. Along with the introduction of the new payment system, fares remained the same for the existing lines but increased for "Rutas Express," regional express services between Mixco and Guatemala City, to GTQ2.00.

Routes

Line 12 (Centra Sur) 

Line 12 starts from Zone 1 in Guatemala City, it runs through the Civic Centre, Bolivar Avenue, Trebol Station, Raul Aguilar Batres Way, and finally terminating at Centra Sur in Zone 12 of neighbouring Villa Nueva city. The line was certified as "Gold" under the BRT Standards in 2014. In the 2023 service update, all direct transfers were removed, meaning  passengers traveling on the line can only connect to other lines by walking a short distance to nearby stations. Additionally, several stations in Zone 1 were closed, while Santa Cecilia station was added.

Branches

Stations

Line 13 (Corredor Central) 
The second line to be opened, Corridor Central or Eje Central, runs through zones 4, 9, and 13 of Guatemala City. The buses are similar to the ones on Line 12, except for the Bi-articulated buses. The change in  bus types was done to allow the line to travel through the historic centre as the streets are narrower compared to those of the CA1.

Another interesting difference between Line 12 and Line 13 is that, when Line 13 was still a proposal, the developer promised to revitalize the areas where the Line would eventually operate. This revitalization included new monuments, better sidewalks, improvement of street vendor spaces, and others.

Line 13 connects with Line 12 at "Plaza Barrios" and "El Calvario", creating seamless connections to the downtown and the southern areas  of the city. Stations on this line are equipped with accessibility features such as braille that tells users the name of the stations and the connecting lines.

This line, as mentioned earlier, runs through the historic downtown, this means that during its journey it will pass by popular landmarks of the city such as the Torre del Reformador, the Acueducto de Pinula, the Bank of Guatemala, Civic Centre, and 6th Avenue, a popular pedestrian-only section of the city. The line was certified as "Silver" under the BRT Standards in 2014. In the 2023 service update, Line 13 had its termini changed to Tipografia in the north and Hangares in the south after a number of stations closed, south of Plaza Argentina. Fuerza Aerea station was opened and all direct transfers were removed.

Branches

Stations

Line 1 (Centro Historico) 
Line 1 works in mainly in Zone 1 of Guatemala's Downtown. This line was built soon after Line 13 began operations. The main goal of this line was to make the historic centre more accessible through safe and reliable public transportation. This line travels from 3rd Street  in Zone 1, towards 18th Street in Zone 1, passing through 5th Street and 8th Street. This line started service on December 19, 2012.
In the 2023 service update, its southern terminus was changed from Tipografia Station to Centro Civico, and a new Sur 2 station was opened.

Branches

Stations

Line 2 (Hipodromo) 
Line 2 was another line that had some private sector support, the goal was to increase ease of travel between the Hipodromo district and the historic district. The colour for this route is similar to the one for Line 1, as they serve very similar areas. Line 2 also has an express service to provide direct connections between Zone 1, and the UMG university campus. The express service does not serve any other stations. In the 2023 service update, the express service was removed entirely, ending service to the UMG university campus. In place of the express service,  San Jose de la Montaña station was opened near the campus.

Branches

Stations

Line 6 (Norte) 
L6  or Eje Norte, runs from 18th Street in Zone 1 to Cementos Progreso Stadium in Guatemala's Zone 6, on its journey, it passes by the popular Colon Park (Parque Colon). Its stations began construction in October 2014 and the route was fully functional by April 25 of 2015. A trip from one end to the other takes an average of 50 minutes.

Branches

Stations

Line 18 (Nor-oriente) 
As its name in Spanish describes, this line travels to the North West corner of the city. Departing from Plaza Barrios-FEGUA Station at 18th Street in Zone 1, ti travels through very important, high traffic areas and sites of interest like Colon Park. This line began operating on April 25, 2014, and continues to be under construction specially in the northern segment of the route to improve road conditions and exclusive traffic lane. This line also has an express service which bypasses most stations and travels directly to Paraiso Station, stopping at San Rafael Station on the way. Geographically, Paraiso is further than Atlantida, making it the northernmost station in the system. In early 2020, Transmetro completed the newest terminal station at Atlantida, renaming the terminal to "Centra Atlantida". This new terminal also provides direct transfers to local Transurbano Routes in the 300 Series. In the 2023 service update, the express service was replaced with all-day local service, stopping at Centra Atlantida along the way. Additionally, FEGUA and Plaza Barrios were no longer noted as interchange stations, despite a walking connection remaining available to Line 12.

Branches

Stations

Line 21 (Discontinued) 
Line 21 started as a pilot project to measure sustainability, and conduct a user needs assessment for service to the USAC university campus, in the southern end of the city. The project began as an Express service between the temporary Trebolito Station, which was close to the Trebol Station, and a temporary Station at the municipal office in Zone 21. The service become a permanent line which provides easier access to the university campus from Line 12. In 2019, the service was complemented by the opening of the Line 7 service which provides students with options for westbound service. The line was named after its southern terminus, located in Zone 21. In the 2023 service update, Line 21 was discontinued in its entirety.

Branches

Stations

Line 7 
Line 7 began service in late 2019. The is intended to cover more suburban service, as well as provide more direct access to the USAC university campus. The line travels between Colon Station in Zone 1, through Zone 7, Zone 11, and terminates at the new USAC Periferico Station. Along the way, it makes direct transfers to Line 6 and 18, while also providing walking connections to Line 1 and 12. In the 2023 service update the line's termini were changed, and all direct transfers were removed, meaning passengers traveling on the line can only transfer by walking to a nearby station.

Branches

Stations

Line 17 
Line 17, along with Line 5, was announced to be under development by the Municipality of Guatemala in March 2021. This line will use a different rolling stock from the standard Marcopolo BRT, instead using a set of city-style buses which are 100% electric. The goal of the line is to provide a connection for North-west and West-end residents to the Centra Atlantida station and Line 18. The line will also intersect with some Transurbano Routes and are expected to share some stations. This project was put on hold as the city moved forward with Line 15 instead.

Line 5 
Line 5, along with Line 17, was announced to be under development by the Municipality of Guatemala in March 2021. This line will use a different rolling stock from the standard Marcopolo BRT, instead using a set of city-style buses which are 100% electric. While original design of the this line was to provide a connection for West-end residents to  Centra Atlantida station and Line 18, the routing has since changed to operate entirely within Zone 5 through using Diagonal 14 for most of its route. The line is expected to face challenges with smaller turn ratios and steeper grades on its route. The route will be 12 km in length, feature 16 stations, and connect with Lines 6, 7, 12, 13, and 18.

Line 15 
Line 15 was announced to be under development by the Municipality of Guatemala in July 2021  The project is to be launched alongside Line 5, leaving the previously announced Line 17 on hold. Line 15 will be 13.5 km in length, feature 14 stations, and connect with Line 13.

References

External links 
  Municipalidad de Guatemala page
 Article about public transport in Guatemala City on CityMayors.com
 Transurbano Map.

Guatemala City
Road transport in Guatemala
Bus rapid transit